Mackenzie MacEachern (born March 9, 1994) is an American ice hockey winger currently playing for the Chicago Wolves in the American Hockey League (AHL) while under contract to the Carolina Hurricanes in the National Hockey League (NHL). He was drafted in the third round, 67th overall, by the St. Louis Blues in the 2012 NHL Entry Draft. MacEachern spent three seasons at Michigan State.

Playing career

Collegiate
After graduating from Brother Rice High School, MacEachern was drafted in the third round, 67th overall by the St. Louis Blues in the 2012 NHL Entry Draft. He played one season for the Chicago Steel in the United States Hockey League. While with the Steel, MacEachern committed to Michigan State University. In his freshman season with the Michigan State Spartans, he played in 36 games and finished second amongst the teams rookies in points.

He scored his first collegiate hat trick in a 3–2 win over Penn State on February 14, 2015. At the conclusion of the season, he was awarded Academic All-Big Ten Honors.

His junior season was his most productive. He led the team with 30 points and 14 goals, while his 16 assists tied for second. At the conclusion of the season he was awarded Academic All-Big Ten Honors. On March 30, 2016, he chose to forego his senior season at Michigan State and sign a two-year entry level contract with the St. Louis Blues.

Professional
MacEachern began his professional career during the 2016–17 season with the Blues' American Hockey League (AHL) affiliate, the Chicago Wolves. In his first season, MacEachern recorded 11 points in 55 games. He had another three points for the club during ten postseason games.

On July 3, 2018, MacEachern signed a one-year, two-way contract with the Blues. He began the 2018–19 season with the Blues' new American League affiliate, the San Antonio Rampage. On January 9, 2019, MacEachern scored two goals in an eventual 5–4 win over the Iowa Wild, helping the Rampage set a new franchise record for most consecutive home wins.

On January 10, 2019, MacEachern was recalled by the Blues. He made his NHL debut that night, skating seven shifts in a 4-1 win over the Montreal Canadiens. On January 25, he scored his first career NHL goal in a 4–3 win over the Los Angeles Kings. On February 9, 2019, the Blues signed MacEachern to a one-year, one-way contract extension. The Blues won the 2019 Stanley Cup, although MacEachern did not skate in any playoff games. However, MacEachern did receive his day with the trophy.

On April 17, 2020, the Blues signed MacEachern to a two-year, $1.8 million contract extension.

As a free agent from the Blues, MacEachern was signed to a one-year, two-way contract with the Carolina Hurricanes on July 15, 2022.

Career statistics

References

External links
 

1994 births
American men's ice hockey left wingers
People from Bloomfield Hills, Michigan
Ice hockey players from Michigan
Living people
Chicago Steel players
Chicago Wolves players
Michigan State Spartans men's ice hockey players
St. Louis Blues draft picks
St. Louis Blues players
San Antonio Rampage players
Springfield Thunderbirds players